Sékouba Camara (born 22 January 1997) is a Guinean professional footballer who plays as a goalkeeper for Ethiopian Premier League club Adama City and the Guinea national team.

References

External links 
 
 

1997 births
Living people
Guinean footballers
Association football goalkeepers
Guinea under-20 international footballers
Guinea international footballers
Athlético de Coléah players
Hapoel Ra'anana A.F.C. players
AS Kaloum Star players
Adama City F.C. players
Guinean expatriate footballers
Expatriate footballers in Israel
Expatriate footballers in Ethiopia
Guinean expatriate sportspeople in Israel
Guinean expatriate sportspeople in Ethiopia
Guinea A' international footballers
2020 African Nations Championship players